The House Trade Working Group (HTWG) is an informal group of Congressmen in the U.S. House of Representatives that is made up of members that take a skeptical view of international trade agreements.  The HTWG was formed by Congressman Mike Michaud and Congresswoman Linda Sánchez during the 110th Congress.  Members of Congress from both parties and outside organizations, who represent American workers, consumers, and businesses, are active participants in the group.  The HTWG organizes press conferences, briefings, letters, and other initiatives to fight trade agreements.  As of the 111th Congress, the membership was as follows (based on signatures affixed to HTWG letters):

Membership

Continuing HTWG Membership for 112th Congress
 Michael H. Michaud (Dem.-Maine) - leader
 Jason Altmire (Dem.-Pennsylvania)
 Joe Baca (Dem.-California)
 Tammy Baldwin (Dem.-Wisconsin)
 Leonard Boswell (Dem.-Iowa)
 Bob Brady (Dem.-Pennsylvania)
 Bruce Braley (Dem.-Iowa)
 Michael Capuano (Dem.-Massachusetts)
 Russ Carnahan (Dem.-Missouri)
 André Carson (Dem.-Indiana)
 Ben Chandler (Dem.-Kentucky)
 Emanuel Cleaver (Dem.-Missouri)
 Steve Cohen (Dem.-Tennessee)
 John Conyers Jr. (Dem.-Michigan)
 Jerry Costello (Dem.-Illinois)
 Elijah Cummings (Dem.-Maryland)
 Peter DeFazio (Dem.-Oregon)
 Rosa DeLauro (Dem.-Connecticut)
 John Dingell (Dem.-Michigan)
 Michael F. Doyle (Dem.-Pennsylvania)
 Donna F. Edwards (Dem.-Maryland)
 Keith Ellison (Dem.-Minnesota)
 Bob Filner (Dem.-California)
 Marcia Fudge (Dem.-Ohio)
 Al Green (Dem.-Texas)
 Gene Green (Dem.-Texas)
 Raúl Grijalva (Dem.-Arizona)
 Luis Gutierrez (Dem.-Illinois)
 Alcee Hastings (Dem.-Florida)
 Brian Higgins (Dem.-New York)
 Maurice D. Hinchey (Dem.-New York)
 Mazie K. Hirono (Dem.-Hawaii)
 Tim Holden (Dem.-Pennsylvania)
 Rush Holt (Dem.-New Jersey)
 Jesse Jackson Jr. (Dem.-Illinois)
 Sheila Jackson-Lee (Dem.-Texas)
 Hank Johnson (Dem.-Georgia)
 Walter B. Jones (Rep.-North Carolina)
 Marcy Kaptur (Dem.-Ohio)
 Dale Kildee (Dem.-Michigan)
 Larry Kissell (Dem.-North Carolina)
 Dennis Kucinich (Dem.-Ohio)
 James Langevin (Dem.-Rhode Island)
 Barbara Lee (Dem.-California)
 Daniel Lipinski (Dem.-Illinois)
 David Loebsack (Dem.-Iowa)
 Stephen Lynch (Dem.-Massachusetts)
 Betty McCollum (Dem.-Minnesota)
 James P. McGovern (Dem.-Massachusetts)
 Mike McIntyre (Dem.-North Carolina)
 Gwen Moore (Dem.-Wisconsin)
 Jerrold Nadler (Dem.-New York)
 Grace Napolitano (Dem.-California)
 Eleanor Holmes Norton (Dem.-District of Columbia)
 Frank Pallone, Jr. (Dem.-New Jersey)
 Donald M. Payne (Dem.-New Jersey)
 Gary Peters (Dem.-Michigan)
 Collin C. Peterson (Dem.-Minnesota)
 Chellie Pingree (Dem.-Maine)
 Nick Rahall (Dem.-West Virginia)
 Mike Ross (Dem.-Arkansas)
 Steven Rothman (Dem.-New Jersey)
 Lucille Roybal-Allard (Dem.-California)
 Tim Ryan (Dem.-Ohio)
 Linda Sanchez (Dem.-California)
 John P. Sarbanes (Dem.-Maryland)
 Jan Schakowsky (Dem.-Illinois)
 Bobby Scott (Dem.-Virginia)
 Heath Shuler (Dem.-North Carolina)
 Brad Sherman (Dem.-California)
 Louise Slaughter (Dem.-New York)
 Chris Smith (Rep.-New Jersey)
 Betty Sutton (Dem.-Ohio)
 John F. Tierney (Dem.-Massachusetts)
 Paul Tonko (Dem.-New York)
 Peter J. Visclosky (Dem.-Indiana)
 Tim Walz (Dem.-Minnesota)
 Debbie Wasserman-Schultz (Dem.-Florida)
 Maxine Waters (Dem.-California)
 Peter Welch (Dem.-Vermont)
 Lynn Woolsey (Dem.-California)
 David Wu (Dem.-Oregon)

HTWG Members of 111th Congress Who Were Defeated 
 Michael A. Arcuri (Dem.-New York)
 John Boccieri (Dem.-Ohio)
 Christopher Carney (Dem.-Pennsylvania)
 Travis W. Childers (Dem.-Mississippi)
 Kathy Dahlkemper (Dem.-Pennsylvania)
 Alan Grayson (Dem.-Florida)
 John Hall (Dem.-New York)
 Phil Hare (Dem.-Illinois)
 Steve Kagen (Dem.-Wisconsin)
 Paul Kanjorski (Dem.-Pennsylvania)
 Carolyn Kilpatrick (Dem.-Michigan) (lost primary bid)
 Mary Jo Kilroy (Dem.-Ohio)
 Dan Maffei (Dem.-New York)
 Alan Mollohan (Dem.-West Virginia) (lost primary bid)
 Patrick Murphy (Dem.-Pennsylvania)
 James L. Oberstar (Dem.-Minnesota)
 Tom Perriello (Dem.-Virginia)
 Mark Schauer (Dem.-Michigan)
 Carol Shea-Porter (Dem.-New Hampshire)
 John Spratt (Dem.-South Carolina)
 Charlie Wilson (Dem.-Ohio)

HTWG Members of 111th Congress Who Will Not Seek Re-Election 
 William Delahunt (Dem.-Massachusetts) (Will not seek re-election)
 Bart Gordon (Dem.-Tennessee) (Will not seek re-election)
 Bart Stupak (Dem.-Michigan) (Will not seek re-election)

Former HTWG Members from 111th Congress 
 Neil Abercrombie (Dem.-Hawaii) (Resigned)
 Eric Massa (Dem.-New York) (Resigned)
 John Murtha (Dem.-Pennsylvania) (Deceased)

Although the membership is somewhat fluid, there were at least 100 members, almost all of them from the Democratic Party.  This constituted more than one-third of the Democratic membership of the 111th Congress.  Note that the two Republicans in the HTWG, Walter B. Jones of North Carolina and Chris Smith of New Jersey, began their careers as Democrats.  Twenty-one HTWG members were defeated in the 2010 Congressional elections and another three members declined to seek re-election.

Ways and Means Committee members 
Only two of the HTWG members are also members of the House of Representatives' Ways and Means Committee, the committee responsible for trade agreements.  Democrats Brian Higgins and Linda Sanchez were the only two Democrats (out of the 26) on the Ways and Means Committee that also caucus with the HTWG.

See also

Congressional Pro-Trade Caucus
United States – Colombia Free Trade Agreement
Panama – United States Trade Promotion Agreement
South Korea – United States Free Trade Agreement
Trans-Pacific Strategic Economic Partnership
United States Trade Representative
Caucuses of the United States Congress
Congressional caucus

References

External links
 111th Congress Congressional Member Organizations (CMOs) 

Members of the United States House of Representatives
Democratic Party (United States)
Free trade agreements of the United States
Foreign trade of the United States
Caucuses of the United States Congress
Political party factions in the United States